The 72nd Division was one of the divisions of the Spanish Republican Army that were organized during the Spanish Civil War on the basis of the Mixed Brigades. It was present on the Aragón and Segre fronts.

History 
The division was created on September 23, 1937, being integrated into the XVIII Army Corps. Initially it grouped the 94th and 224th Mixed Brigades, recently created. In December 1937 the unit was sent to the Teruel sector, but it was so far behind in its organization that it did not intervene in the Battle of Teruel. It performed poorly during the Aragon Offensive, being seriously broken. In addition, its commander, José María Enciso Madolell, was taken prisoner by the nationalist forces.  The 72nd Division was dissolved on March 11, 1938,  and its remains were assigned to the Ebro Autonomous Group.

It was recreated again on April 19 of that year, within the XVIII Army Corps. At the end of May it participated in the Balaguer Offensive, in support of other units, Although this offensive ended up failing. During the following months it remained in the rear, without taking part in military actions. At the beginning of the Catalonia Offensive the unit was overwhelmed by the advance of the nationalist 84th Division, in the Camarasa area. The resistance put up by the division was minimal, which led to the removal of its commander — Pascual Saura. After that, it retreated together with the rest of the XVIII Army Corps.

Command 
 Commanders
 José María Enciso Madolell;
 Mariano Buxó Martín;
 Pascual Saura;

 Commissioners
 Antonio Barea Arenas, of the CNT;
 Ramón Estarelles Úbeda, of the PCE;

Order of battle

Notes

References

Bibliography 
 
 
 
 
 
 
 
 
 
 

Military units and formations established in 1937
Military units and formations disestablished in 1938
Military units and formations established in 1938
Military units and formations disestablished in 1939
Divisions of Spain
Military units and formations of the Spanish Civil War
Military history of Spain
Armed Forces of the Second Spanish Republic